Gabrijela Skender (born 7 October 1999) is a Croatian cross-country skier. She competed in the women's sprint at the 2018 Winter Olympics.

References

External links
 

1999 births
Living people
Croatian female cross-country skiers
Olympic cross-country skiers of Croatia
Cross-country skiers at the 2018 Winter Olympics
Place of birth missing (living people)
Cross-country skiers at the 2016 Winter Youth Olympics